George William Sartorius (1759–1828) was a British artist. The Sartorius family were painters of sporting activities. Sartorius specialised in animals and still lifes. He exhibited at the Free Society of Artists from 1773 to 1779.

References

Equine artists
18th-century English painters
English male painters
19th-century English painters
1759 births
1828 deaths
British people of German descent
19th-century English male artists
18th-century English male artists